This is a chronological list of party video games. The genre features a collection of minigames, designed to be intuitive and easy to control, and allow for competition between many players.

References

Party